Adam Raška may refer to:
 Adam Raška (ice hockey, born 1994)
 Adam Raška (ice hockey, born 2001)